Hollywood Casino is a brand owned by Penn National Gaming from its acquisition of Hollywood Casino Corp. It may refer to:

Hollywood Casino Aurora –  Aurora, Illinois
Hollywood Casino Bangor – Bangor, Maine
Hollywood Casino Baton Rouge – Baton Rouge, Louisiana
Hollywood Casino at Charles Town Races – Charles Town, West Virginia
Hollywood Casino Columbus – Columbus, Ohio
Hollywood Casino Gulf Coast – Bay St. Louis, Mississippi
Hollywood Casino at Greektown – Detroit, Michigan 
Hollywood Casino Jamul – San Diego (now Jamul Casino) – Jamul, California
Hollywood Casino Joliet – Joliet, Illinois
Hollywood Casino Amphitheatre (Tinley Park, Illinois)
Hollywood Casino at Kansas Speedway – Kansas City, Kansas
The Hollywood Casino 400, a NASCAR race
Hollywood Casino Lawrenceburg – Lawrenceburg, Indiana
Hollywood Casino Morgantown – Morgantown, Pennsylvania
Hollywood Casino at Penn National Race Course – Grantville, Pennsylvania
Hollywood Casino Perryville – Perryville, Maryland
Hollywood Casino St. Louis – Maryland Heights, Missouri
Hollywood Casino Amphitheatre (Maryland Heights, Missouri)
Hollywood Casino Shreveport  (now Eldorado Casino) – Shreveport, Louisiana 
Hollywood Casino Toledo – Toledo, Ohio
Hollywood Casino Tunica – Tunica Resorts, Mississippi
Hollywood Casino York – York, Pennsylvania
Hollywood Gaming at Dayton Raceway – Dayton, Ohio
Hollywood Gaming at Mahoning Valley Race Course – Youngstown, Ohio